The Curtiss-Wright XF-87 Blackhawk (previously designated the XP-87) was a prototype American all-weather jet fighter-interceptor, and the company's last aircraft project. Designed as a replacement for the World War II–era propeller-driven P-61 Black Widow night/interceptor aircraft, the XF-87 lost in government procurement competition to the Northrop F-89 Scorpion. The loss of the contract was fatal to the company; the Curtiss-Wright Corporation closed down its aviation division, selling its assets to North American Aviation.

Design and development
The aircraft started life as a project for an attack aircraft, designated XA-43. When the United States Army Air Forces issued a requirement for a jet-powered all-weather fighter in 1945, the design was reworked for that request.

The XP-87 was a large mid-wing aircraft with four engines paired in underwing pods, with a mid-mounted tailplane and tricycle undercarriage. Two crew members (pilot and radar operator) sat side by side under a single canopy. Armament was to be a nose-mounted, powered turret containing four 20 mm (0.79 in) cannon, but this was never fitted to the prototypes. Instead the aircraft was armed with four fixed forward firing 20mm cannon.

Operational history
The first flight of the XF-87 Blackhawk was on 5 March 1948. Although the top speed was slower than expected, the aircraft was otherwise acceptable, and the newly formed (in September 1947) United States Air Force placed orders for 57 F-87A fighters and 30 RF-87A reconnaissance aircraft just over a month later. Since the performance problems were due to lack of power, the four Westinghouse XJ34-WE-7 turbojets of the prototypes were to be substituted for two General Electric J47 jets in production models. One of the two XF-87 prototypes was to be modified as a test bed for the new engines.

At this point, the USAF decided that the Northrop F-89 Scorpion was a more promising aircraft. The F-87 contract was cancelled on 10 October 1948, and both prototypes were scrapped.

Variants

 XP-87
 First flight was March 5, 1948

 XF-87
 Redesignated XP-87

 F-87A
 Production fighter version (canceled)

 RF-87A
 Reconnaissance variant (canceled)

Specifications (XF-87 No.1)

See also

References

Notes

Bibliography

 Angelucci, Enzo and Peter Bowers. The American Fighter: The Definitive Guide To American Fighter Aircraft From 1917 To The Present. New York: Orion Books, 1987. .
 Bowers, Peter M. Curtiss Aircraft 1907–1947. London: Putnam, 1979. .
 Buttler, Tony. American Secret Projects: Fighters & Interceptors 1945–1978. Hinckley, UK: Midland Publishing, 2008, First edition, 2007. .
 Jenkins, Dennis R. and Tony R. Landis. Experimental & Prototype U.S. Air Force Jet Fighters. North Branch, Minnesota, USA: Specialty Press, 2008. .
 Green, William and Gordon Swanborough. The Great Book Of Fighters: An encyclopedia of every fighter aircraft built and flown. Osceola, WI, USA: MBI Publishing Company, 2001. .
 Knaack, Marcelle Size. Encyclopedia of US Air Force Aircraft and Missile Systems: Volume 1 Post-World War II Fighters 1945–1973. Washington, DC: Office of Air Force History, 1978. .
 Pace, Steve. X-Fighters: USAF Experimental and Prototype Fighters, XP-59 to YF-23. St. Paul, Minnesota, USA: Motorbooks International, 1991. .
 Winchester, Jim. Concept Aircraft: Prototypes, X-Planes and Experimental Aircraft. Rochester, Kent, UK: Grange books plc, 2005. .

External links

 Curtiss XP-87/XF-87 Blackhawk
 Uncommon Aircraft: XF-87 Blackhawk
 Several pictures of the XF-87 45-59600

F-087 Blackhawk
Curtiss F-87
Quadjets
Cancelled military aircraft projects of the United States
Mid-wing aircraft
Aircraft first flown in 1948